The  Noddy  is a Chesapeake Bay log canoe, built in 1930, by Oliver Duke in Royal Oak, Maryland, She measures 27'-6" long, with a beam of 6'-4". Her log hull remains unglassed, is painted white, and she races under No. 1. She one of the last 22 surviving traditional Chesapeake Bay racing log canoes that carry on a tradition of racing on the Eastern Shore of Maryland that has existed since the 1840s. In 1985 she was located at St. Michaels, Talbot County, Maryland.

She was overhauled in 1999.  She is located at Chestertown, Kent County, Maryland.

She was listed on the National Register of Historic Places in 1985.

References

External links
, including photo in 1983, at Maryland Historical Trust

Ships in Talbot County, Maryland
Ships on the National Register of Historic Places in Maryland
National Register of Historic Places in Talbot County, Maryland